Bodzanowo may refer to the following places:
Bodzanowo, Radziejów County in Kuyavian-Pomeranian Voivodeship (north-central Poland)
Bodzanowo, Gmina Choceń in Kuyavian-Pomeranian Voivodeship (north-central Poland)
Bodzanowo, Gmina Lubraniec in Kuyavian-Pomeranian Voivodeship (north-central Poland)